Kantabanji railway station is a railway station near Kantabanjhi town of Balangir district, Odisha. It serves Kantabanji town. Its code is KBJ. It has two platforms. Passenger, Express, and Superfast trains halt here.

Trains

The following major trains halt at Kantabanji railway station in both directions:

 Visakhapatnam–Bhagat Ki Kothi Express
 Korba–Visakhapatnam Express
 Gandhidham–Puri Weekly Superfast Express
 Puri–Surat Express
 Puri–Ahmedabad Express
 Puri–Ahmedabad Weekly Express
 Gandhidham–Puri Weekly Express
 Puri–Ajmer Express
 Puri–Durg Express
 Lokmanya Tilak Terminus–Puri Superfast Express
 Puri–Sainagar Shirdi Express
 Samata Express
 Bilaspur–Tirupati Express
 Visakhapatnam–Lokmanya Tilak Terminus Superfast Express
 Durg–Jagdalpur Express

References

Railway stations in Balangir district
Sambalpur railway division